Adam Łapeta (born 9 November 1987) is a Polish professional basketball player.

Professional career
Previously a member of the Prokom Trefl Sopot youth team, Łapeta made his career debut in 2005 on the main squad in the Polish Basketball League (PLK). He played in five consecutive EuroLeague seasons with the team between 2007 and 2012, making his last season the most successful one (4.7 points per game, 4.3 rebounds while shooting 55% from the field and 73% from the free throw line). He played with Zielona Góra in the EuroCup the following year.

In 2013, he moved to Dzūkija Alytus of the Lithuanian Basketball League (LKL). He became a center piece of the team, leading the league in blocks per game during his first season there (with 1.5). He was traded for Julius Jucikas to Lietuvos rytas Vilnius in early 2016. On 13 September 2017, Łapeta agreed to mutually part ways with Lietuvos rytas Vilnius.

On July 2, 2018, he signed a one-year deal with Asseco Gdynia of the PLK.

On September 14, 2022, Łapeta signed with Taoyuan Leopards of the T1 League.

On March 5, 2023, Taoyuan Leopards terminated the contract relationship with Łapeta due to the injury.

National team career
Łapeta represented Poland at the 2005 European U-18 Championship. He also played in EuroBasket 2011, achieving a high of 8 points and 6 rebounds against the tournament hosts Lithuania.

Honours

Prokom Trefl Sopot/Asseco Prokom Gdynia

Polish PLK Champion: (2006, 2008, 2009, 2010, 2011, 2012)
Polish Cup Winner: 2006, 2008
 PLK All Star Game 2010

Lietuvos Rytas Vilnius

Lithuanian LKL Bronze medalist: 2015/2016, 2016/2017
Lithuanian Basketball Cup Winner: 2016

BM Slam Stal Ostrów Wielkopolski

Polish PLK Vice Champion: (2018)
 All-PLK First Team 2017/2018 
 PLK blocks leader (2017/2018)

Asseco Gdynia
Polish PLK Bronze medalist: (2019)

References

1987 births
Living people
Asseco Gdynia players
Basket Zielona Góra players
BC Dzūkija players
BC Rytas players
Centers (basketball)
KK Włocławek players
People from Puck, Poland
Polish men's basketball players
Stal Ostrów Wielkopolski players
Taoyuan Leopards players
T1 League imports